William Lewis Couch (November 20, 1850 – April 21, 1890), a native of North Carolina and later a resident of Kansas, was best known as a leader of the Boomer Movement and as the first provisional mayor of what became Oklahoma City, Oklahoma. He joined the Boomer Movement in 1880 and became the sole leader of the movement after David L. Payne's death on November 28, 1884.  He participated in the Oklahoma Land Run on April 22, 1889, and was  elected provisional mayor soon thereafter on April 26, 1889.  He remained mayor until November 11, 1889. On April 4, 1890, he was shot by J. C. Adams in a  dispute over his homestead claim, and died on April 21, 1890.

Early life
William was born in Wilkes County, North Carolina, on November 20, 1850, as the eldest child of Meshach H. and Mary Bryan Couch. His father moved the family to Kansas after the end of the Civil War. He had little formal education, although he became known as an avid reader. William married Cynthia Gordon, a Quaker woman who was older than himself. William and Cynthia later moved to Butler County, Kansas, in 1871, where they bought a farm near Douglass. When a railroad was built from Emporia to Wichita about 1874, William gave up farming to become an entrepreneur in Wichita. His businesses included selling grain, operating an elevator, trading and selling horses and mules, and running a combination hardware and grocery store. However, he soon lost much of his fortune because of reverses in the financial markets. Only the profits in his livestock business enabled him to support his family.

Boomer movement
In the fall of 1879, William heard David L. Payne give a talk about the availability of land for homesteads in Indian Territory (which Payne called "Oklahoma Country." Payne asserted that the land in the territory was public land and thus should be free to homesteaders. Meanwhile, the U.S. government was already busy forcing Indian tribes onto these lands and warning would-be settlers that the lands were not free. Nevertheless, Couch became an enthusiastic follower of Payne's movement, formally joining the Boomers in 1880. William moved his family back to Douglass, where his father could look after them. By then, William and Cynthia had five children. William then became more active in the Payne movement and checking out locations that might make suitable homesteads.

Couch joined the Boomer Movement in 1880. Inspired by Payne, he soon became one of the Boomer leaders. In February, 1883, he led a group of Boomers into Indian Territory to stake out land claims. The army intervened, arrested the would-be settlers and interned them at Fort Reno, until they returned to Kansas. Couch immediately began planning new forays into the Oklahoma Country. He led two new expeditions, one in August 1883 and the other in April 1884.

William Couch became the sole leader of the movement after David L. Payne died of a heart attack in Wellington, Kansas, on November 28, 1884.  One of his first acts in this new role was to lead a group of about 300 would-be settlers from Wellington across the Cherokee Outlet to a suitable area inside Indian Territory. On December 12, 1884, the expedition came to a stream that they named Still Water. A detachment of the U.S. Cavalry quickly arrived to cut off the Boomers' supplies, after which the invaders were arrested and forced out of the territory. After being released from custody, Couch spent the next few years in Washington, D. C., lobbying for the opening of the Unassigned Lands to public settlement. His arguments ultimately succeeded.

End of political career and death
He participated in the Oklahoma Land Run on April 22, 1889, and was elected provisional mayor of the newly founded Oklahoma City, Oklahoma, on April 27, 1889. He remained mayor until he resigned on November 11, 1889. On April 4, 1890, he was shot by J. C. Adams in a duel involving a dispute over his homestead claim, and died on April 21, 1890. Adams was arrested, tried in a federal court and spent several years in prison. The claims of both men were eventually dismissed.

See also
Boomers (Oklahoma settlers)
David L. Payne
Oklahoma Territory

Notes

References

1850 births
1890 deaths
Mayors of Oklahoma City
Assassinated American politicians
19th-century American politicians
Pre-statehood history of Oklahoma
People from Wilkes County, North Carolina
People from Douglass, Kansas
Assassinated American county and local politicians